Kelly Kovach Schoenly is an American softball coach and former softball player.  She has been the head softball coach at Ohio State since June 2012.  She previously served as the head softball coach at Miami (Ohio) from 2006 to 2012.  She has also been an assistant coach at Michigan and Penn State.

Kovach Schoenly played college softball at the University of Michigan from 1992 to 1995. She was selected as a first-team NFCA All-American in 1995 and a CoSIDA Academic All-American for 1994–1995.  She was also named the Big Ten Conference Freshman of the Year in 1992 and Big Ten Conference Pitcher of the Year in 1992 and 1995.

Early years
Kovach Schoenly grew up in western Pennsylvania and played softball, basketball and volleyball at Baldwin High School in suburban Pittsburgh.  In 2012, she was inducted into the Western Pennsylvania Interscholastic Athletic League Hall of Fame.

University of Michigan
Kovach Schoenly played college softball at the University of Michigan from 1992 to 1995.  In four years at Michigan, she appeared in 142 games, including 112 starts (ranking 4th in Michigan history in both categories).  She ranks among Michigan's all-time leaders in career wins (72 -7th), career strikeouts (465 – 7th), career shutouts (33 – 6th), innings pitched (769.0 – 4th), and career complete games (81 – 6th).  She was selected as a first-team NFCA All-American in 1995 and a CoSIDA Academic All-American for 1994–1995.  She was named the Big Ten Conference Freshman of the Year in 1992 and Big Ten Conference Pitcher of the Year in 1992 and 1995.  She was also a co-captain of Michigan's 1995 softball team.

Kovach was also a solid batter in college.  On April 1, 1995, she hit a grand slam against Indiana, only the second grand slam in Michigan softball history.  She also had 61 RBIs and 21 doubles in 1995, both of which were Michigan single-season records at the time.

Kovach received a bachelor's degree in elementary education from Michigan in 1995. She also received a master's degree in elementary mathematics education from Michigan in 1998.

Coaching career
Kovach Schoenly was encouraged to pursue coaching rather than elementary education by her collegiate coach at Michigan, Carol Hutchins. She began her coaching career as an assistant coach at Michigan from 1995 to 1998.  The Wolverines advanced to the Women's College World Series in all three years while Schoenly was an assistant coach.

From 1998 to 2006, Schoenly was an assistant softball coach at Penn State.  During her eight years at Penn State, the softball team received six NCAA Tournament berths.
 
In 2006, on the recommendation of Michigan head coach Carol Hutchins, Kovach Schoenly was hired as the head softball coach at Miami (Ohio).  She was the head coach at Miami from 2006 to 2012 and compiled a 188–152–1 in six seasons at Miami.  She is Miami's all-time winningest coach with 188 career victories.  Her teams at Miami won two MAC tournament titles (2009 and 2012) and also received two NCAA Tournament berths (2009 and 2012).

In June 2012, she was named head softball coach at Ohio State.  In her first season at Ohio State, she led the Buckeyes to a 34–22 record.

Personal
Kovach Schoenly is married to tennis pro Doug Schoenly.  They have a daughter, Danielle.

Head coaching record

References

Year of birth missing (living people)
Place of birth missing (living people)
Living people
Michigan Wolverines softball players
Female sports coaches
American softball coaches
Michigan Wolverines softball coaches
Ohio State Buckeyes softball coaches
Penn State Nittany Lions softball coaches
Softball players from Pennsylvania